Agrotis subalba, the grey cutworm, is a moth of the family Noctuidae. The species was first described by Francis Walker in 1857. It is found in South Africa.

It is considered a pest on Zea mays (corn or maize) and Lycopersicon esculentum (tomato).

External links
 

Endemic moths of South Africa
Agrotis
Moths of Africa
Moths described in 1857